"I'm Really Hot" is a song by American rapper Missy Elliott. It was written and produced by and Elliott Timbaland for her fifth studio album This Is Not a Test! (2003). Released as the second and final single from the album, it reached the top 20 of the Danish Singles Chart. The accompanying music video makes reference to the Quentin Tarantino movie Kill Bill: Volume 1 (2003), and includes a dance break over "Hot Music" by Soho.

Music video
A music video for "I'm Really Hot" was directed by Bryan Barber. Billboard critic Brian Josephs noted that the clip "expands on the love of Japanese culture from the Meyers videos and makes it the main crux. Missy has beef with a Japanese crew, so they dance through it. "I'm Really Hot" works more as a time capsule than most Missy videos from the '00s, with its loose-fitting blazer/jeans attire. And krumping."

Track listing
 CD Maxi-Single 
"I'm Really Hot" (Amended Version) – 3:42
"I'm Really Hot" (Explicit Version) – 3:42
"I'm Really Hot" (Instrumental) – 3:44
"Pass That Dutch" (Remix Amended; featuring Busta Rhymes) – 4:34
"Pass That Dutch" (Remix Explicit; featuring Busta Rhymes) – 4:34

 CD Single 
"I'm Really Hot" (Explicit Version) – 3:42
"I'm Really Hot" (Instrumental) – 3:44
"Hurt Sumhtin" – 3:43
"Pass That Dutch" (Remix Explicit; featuring Busta Rhymes) – 4:34

Charts

Release history

References

2004 singles
Missy Elliott songs
Music videos directed by Bryan Barber
Song recordings produced by Timbaland
Songs written by Missy Elliott
2003 songs
Songs written by Timbaland
Atlantic Records singles